Lexmark International, Inc. v. Static Control Components, Inc., is an American legal case involving the computer printer company Lexmark, which had designed an authentication system using a microcontroller so that only authorized toner cartridges could be used. The resulting litigation (described by Justice Scalia in 2014 as "sprawling", and by others as having the potential to go on as long as Jarndyce v. Jarndyce) has resulted in significant decisions affecting United States intellectual property and trademark law.

In separate rulings in 2004 and 2012, the United States Court of Appeals for the Sixth Circuit ruled that:

 circumvention of Lexmark's ink cartridge authentication does not violate the Digital Millennium Copyright Act (DMCA), and
 Static Control Components had standing basis under the Lanham Act to sue Lexmark for false advertising in relation to its promotion of the program, which was unanimously affirmed in 2014 by the Supreme Court of the United States.

The Supreme Court's 2014 ruling also affects statutory interpretation in the area of standing in pursuing lawsuits on statutory grounds in a wide variety of areas in federal court.

Background
Lexmark is a large manufacturer of laser and inkjet printers, and Static Control Components (SCC) is a company that makes "a wide range of technology products, including microchips that it sells to third-party companies for use in remanufactured toner cartridges."

In an effort to control and reduce the refilling and redistribution of toner cartridges, Lexmark began distributing two distinct varieties of its toner cartridges. Under its Prebate Program (now known as the Lexmark Return Program), through a shrinkwrap license, Lexmark sold certain printer cartridges at a discount (as much as $50 less) to customers who agreed to "use the cartridge only once and return it only to Lexmark for remanufacturing or recycling". Lexmark's "Non-Prebate" cartridges could be refilled by the user without restrictions and were sold without any discount.

Lexmark touted the Prebate Program as a benefit to the environment and to their customers, since it would allow customers to get cheaper cartridges, and the benefit to Lexmark was that it could keep empty cartridges out of the hands of competing rechargers. Many users purchased such cartridges under the stated conditions.

To enforce this agreement, Lexmark cartridges included a computer chip that included a 55-byte computer program (the "Toner Loading Program") which communicated with a "Printer Engine Program" built into the printer. The program calculated the amount of toner used during printing: when the calculations indicated that the original supply of Lexmark toner should be exhausted, the printer would stop functioning, even if the cartridge had been refilled. In addition, if the chip did not perform an encrypted authentication sequence, or if the Toner Loading Program on the chip did not have a checksum matching exactly a value stored elsewhere on the chip, the printer would not use the cartridge.

In 2002, SCC developed its own computer chip that would duplicate the 'handshake' used by the Lexmark chip, and that also included a verbatim copy of the Toner Loading Program, which SCC claimed was necessary to allow the printer to function. A Prebate cartridge could successfully be refilled if Lexmark's chip on the cartridge was replaced with the SCC chip. SCC began selling its "Smartek" chips to toner cartridge rechargers.

Copyright and DMCA claims: 2004 Circuit Court ruling

At the district court
On December 30, 2002, Lexmark sued SCC in the United States District Court for the Eastern District of Kentucky. The suit claimed that SCC had:

 violated copyright law by copying the Toner Loading Program, and
 violated the DMCA by selling products that circumvented the encrypted authentication sequence between the Lexmark cartridge chip and the printer.

On March 3, 2003, Judge Karl S. Forester granted a preliminary injunction to Lexmark, blocking SCC from distributing its cartridge chips. The ruling was seen to be controversial.

On the copyright claim, the court found that:

 the use of the Toner Loading Program was indeed a likely copyright violation, because the Toner Loading Program was not a "lock-out code" that SCC was entitled to copy under the DMCA, and because the Toner Loading Program could be rewritten in different ways (and therefore had enough creativity to qualify for copyright protection).
 the Copyright Office's decision to grant copyright registration to the two programs showed that the programs were probably copyrightable.
 because of the complexity of the authentication system, SCC could not have known that it could bypass the authentication without using Lexmark's copyrighted program; but it held that this did not matter because "Innocent infringement, however, is still infringement."
 fair use did not apply.

On the DMCA claims, the court found that the SCC microchip circumvented Lexmark's authentication sequence, and that the reverse engineering exception to the DMCA did not apply, because it only covers the independent creation of new programs that must interoperate with existing ones, and SCC did not create any new program.

Appellate ruling
SCC appealed the district court's ruling to the Sixth Circuit Court of Appeals. As is usual for federal appeals in the United States, a three judge panel heard the appeal – for this matter, the panel consisted of appellate judges Gilbert S. Merritt and Jeffrey S. Sutton, and John Feikens (a district court judge temporarily assisting the appeals court). On October 26, 2004, the judges issued their ruling, in which all three judges wrote separate opinions.

Majority opinion
In the majority opinion, Judge Sutton (with Judge Merritt agreeing) reversed the lower court's ruling and vacated the temporary injunction, holding that Lexmark was unlikely to succeed in its case. The case was remanded to the district court for further proceedings consistent with the opinion.

On the copyright claim, the court noted that unlike patents, copyright protection cannot be applied to ideas, but only to particular, creative expressions of ideas. Distinguishing between an unprotectable idea and a protectable creative expression is difficult in the context of computer programs; even though it may be possible to express the same idea in many different programs, "practical realities"—hardware and software constraints, design standards, industry practices, etc.—may make different expressions impractical. "Lock-out" codes—codes that must be performed in a certain way in order to bypass a security system—are generally considered functional rather than creative, and thus unprotectable.

With these principles in mind, it was held that the district court had erred in three ways:
 It had held that the Toner Loading Program was copyrightable simply because it "could be written in a number of different ways", without considering the practical realities.
 Because of this mistaken standard, it had refused to consider whether or not the alternative Toner Loading Programs proposed by Lexmark were practical.
 It had concluded that the Toner Loading Program was not a "lock-out code", because it had not sufficiently considered how difficult it would be for SCC—without Lexmark's knowledge of the code's structure and purpose—to alter the code and still pass the printer's authentication mechanisms.

On the DMCA claims, the majority first considered Lexmark's claim that the SCC chip circumvented the access controls on the Printer Engine Program. It held that Lexmark's authentication sequence did not "control access" to the program; rather, the purchase of the printer itself allowed access to the program:

Likewise, the majority opinion held that anyone purchasing a printer and toner cartridge could read the Toner Loading Program from the printer; so SCC did not circumvent an access control on the Toner Loading Program either.

The court also rejected the district court's conclusion that the interoperability defense did not apply. Since SCC had offered testimony that its chips did indeed contain independently-created programs in addition to Lexmark's Toner Loading Program, the Toner Loading Program could be seen as necessary to allow interoperation between SCC's own programs and the Lexmark printer.

Concurring opinion
In a concurring opinion, Judge Merritt agreed with Judge Sutton on the outcome of this particular case, but also indicated that he would go farther:

He opined that even if the programs involved were more complex (and thus more deserving of copyright protection), the key question would be the purpose of the circumvention technology. Under his proposed framework, if a third party manufacturer's use of a circumvention technology was intended only to allow its products to interoperate with another manufacturer's—and not to gain any independent benefit from the functionality of the code being copied—then that circumvention would be permissible.

Concurring/dissenting opinion
Judge Feikens also wrote an opinion, agreeing with many of the majority opinion's results (though sometimes for different reasons), but disagreeing with its conclusion on the Toner Loading Program.

Concerning the copyrightability of the Toner Loading Program, he found that the record supported Lexmark's claim that the program could have been implemented in any number of ways, and therefore Lexmark's implementation was creative and copyrightable. Agreeing that the record was inadequate for the district court to conclude that the Toner Loading Program was a "lock-out code", he noted that Lexmark's expert had testified that the entire Toner Loading Program process could be turned off by flipping a single bit in the chip's code, and that it should have been possible for SCC to discover this; so copying the program may not have been practically necessary too.

On the DMCA counts, Feikens agreed that Lexmark had not established a violation with regards to the Toner Loading Program, but for a very different reason than that found by the majority opinion. He noted that SCC had testified that it had not even been aware that the Toner Loading Program existed; it had copied the data on the Lexmark printer chip (including the Toner Loading Program) purely in an attempt to bypass the protection on the Printer Engine Program. Since the DMCA requires that an infringer knowingly circumvent access controls on the protected program, SCC could not have knowingly circumvented protections on a program it did not know existed. With regards to the Printer Engine Program, he agreed with the majority opinion, but also noted in his belief that the consumer had acquired the rights to access this program by purchasing the printer, and therefore the DMCA would not apply to attempts to access it.

Request for a rehearing
Lexmark filed a request for the full Sixth Circuit to hear the case en banc. The Sixth Circuit rejected this request in February 2005.

Rule 13 of the United States Supreme Court Rules of Procedure requires the losing party in a case before a court of appeals to file a petition for a writ of certiorari within 90 days from the date the court of appeals enters its judgment, or from the date of the denial of a petition for rehearing in the court of appeals. The Sixth Circuit's judgment became final for all purposes when the 90-day period expired without Lexmark filing a cert petition.

Impact
The Sixth Circuit's decision is noteworthy for at least two reasons:

 All three judges took pains to emphasize in their opinions that the DMCA must be interpreted consistently with the broader public purposes of the copyright statute, rather than as a grant of new powers to makers of technology products to impose additional restrictions not contemplated by copyright.
 It represents a rare defeat for large printer manufacturers like Lexmark, Hewlett-Packard and Epson in their ongoing battle with third-party ink sellers.

Lexmark 2004 is also consistent with subsequent jurisprudence in the United States Court of Appeals for the Federal Circuit in The Chamberlain Group, Inc. v. Skylink Technologies, Inc., and therefore emphasizes that the DMCA was intended to create a new type of liability  not a property right  over durable goods incorporating copyrighted material.

Trademark and false advertising: 2012 Circuit Court ruling

District Court
Before the Sixth Circuit's ruling, Static Control initiated a separate action in 2004 seeking declaratory judgment under federal copyright laws and the DMCA that its newly modified chips did not infringe Lexmark's copyrights, and Lexmark counterclaimed raising patent infringement, DMCA violations, and tort claims, and added three remanufacturers as third-party defendants.

On remand, Lexmark successfully moved to dismiss all of Static Control's counterclaims. During the course of the proceedings, the court ruled that:

 nine of Lexmark's mechanical patents were valid, but two of its design patents were invalid,
 summary judgment would be granted to Lexmark on its claims of direct patent infringement against three co-defendants, and
 Lexmark's single-use license for Prebate cartridges was valid, which prevented Lexmark's patents from exhausting following the initial sale of the Prebate toner cartridges to end users. However, this was subsequently modified by the judge later, after the United States Supreme Court's decision in Quanta Computer, Inc. v. LG Electronics, Inc.

Therefore, the trial's issues consisted only of Lexmark's claim of induced patent infringement against Static Control and Static Control's defense of patent misuse. The district judge Gregory Frederick Van Tatenhove instructed the jury that its findings on patent misuse would be advisory; the jury held that Static Control did not induce patent infringement and advised that Lexmark misused its patents. Lexmark renewed its earlier request for a judgment as a matter of law and also filed a motion for a retrial on its patent inducement claim, both of which the district court denied. Both parties timely appealed.

The appellate ruling
In a unanimous ruling, the district court's findings were affirmed, except for its dismissal of Static Control's counterclaims under the Lanham Act and North Carolina state law. These were reversed and remanded for further consideration.

In particular, it was held:

 the 6th Circuit had jurisdiction to hear the appeal under  (as opposed to being referred to the United States Court of Appeals for the Federal Circuit under ),
 the district court did not abuse its discretion in increasing the amount of the injunction bond entered during the preliminary injunction hearing,
 SCC's federal antitrust counterclaims under  §§ 4 and 16 of the Clayton Act for violations of §§ 1 and 2 of the Sherman Act failed for lack of standing, under the standard set in Associated Gen. Contractors of Cal., Inc. v. Cal. State Council of Carpenters ("AGC"),
 SCC's counterclaim for false advertising under the Lanham Act is valid, as the 6th Circuit applies a "reasonable interest" standard to determine standing (in common with the 2nd Circuit, as opposed to the categorical test used in the Seventh, Ninth and Tenth Circuits, or the AGC approach used in the Third, Fifth, Eighth and Eleventh Circuits),
 SCC's counterclaim for unfair competition and false advertising under North Carolina's Unfair Deceptive Trade Practices Act is valid under state law, as determined by the North Carolina Court of Appeals

Impact
The ruling also let stand the district court's ruling of the impact of Quanta Computer, Inc. v. LG Electronics, Inc. on the exhaustion doctrine in the area of patent law. By finding that the sale of patented goods, even when subject to valid license restrictions, exhausts patent rights, it essentially gives Quanta a broad interpretation, which threatens to render unenforceable through patent law differential licensing schemes that attempt to distinguish separate fields of use for a patented item. However, the United States Court of Appeals for the Federal Circuit's ruling in Lexmark Int'l, Inc. v. Impression Prods., Inc. reopened the issue. The Court held that after the sale of a patented item, the patent holder cannot sue for patent infringement relating to further use of that item, even when in violation of a contract with a customer or imported from outside the United States.

Scope of federal statutory torts: 2014 ruling at the Supreme Court

Appeal of the 2012 ruling
The Circuit Court's ruling with respect to standing under the Lanham Act was appealed by Lexmark to the Supreme Court of the United States, on which certiorari was granted on June 3, 2013. The case was heard on December 3, 2013, and the question presented to the Court was:

Lexmark argued in favour of the AGC test, while SCC argued that the appropriate test should actually be that of the "zone of interests" protected by the statute that has been applied in cases involving the Administrative Procedure Act, the Endangered Species Act, and Title VII of the Civil Rights Act. At the hearing, it appeared that Lexmark's submission received more intensive examination than SCC's.

Decision
On March 25, 2014, the US Supreme Court unanimously affirmed the Sixth Circuit's holding that Static Control did have standing to sue under the Lanham Act.

The Court developed a new test for assessing standing in false advertising, rejecting the existing tests, including the Sixth Circuit's "reasonable interest test". In that regard, the approach adopted by Scalia J. consists of several steps:

Under Article III, the plaintiff must have suffered or be imminently threatened with a concrete and particularized "injury in fact" that is fairly traceable to the challenged action of the defendant and likely to be redressed by a favorable judicial decision.
AGC requires the ascertainment, as a matter of statutory interpretation, of the "scope of the private remedy created by" Congress, and the "class of persons who [could] maintain a private damages action under" a legislatively conferred cause of action.
A statutory cause of action extends only to plaintiffs whose interests "fall within the zone of interests protected by the law invoked," and the "zone of interests" formulation applies to all statutorily created causes of action, as it is a "requirement of general application" and Congress is presumed to "legislat[e] against the background of" it, "which applies unless it is expressly negated."
A statutory cause of action is also presumed to be limited to plaintiffs whose injuries are proximately caused by violations of the statute. A plaintiff suing under §1125(a) ordinarily must show that its economic or reputational injury flows directly from the deception wrought by the defendant's advertising; and that occurs when deception of consumers causes them to withhold trade from the plaintiff.
Direct application of the zone-of-interests test and the proximate-cause requirement supplies the relevant limits on who may sue under §1125(a).

In discussing the scope of proximate cause, Scalia noted:

The previous tests adopted by the various Circuit Courts were dismissed as being problematical on several grounds:

Impact
The Court's ruling was described as being "a tour de force treatment of statutory standing," and being "certain to earn reprinting in casebooks and citations in briefs for decades to come." It was seen to have greater scope than what was directly related to the case at hand:

 it was noted as being unusual for the current Court to open the door to more lawsuits
 the Court has rejected a notable body of existing doctrine relating to standing
 the Court also took the unusual step of rejecting all Circuit Court interpretations on the question through substituting its own take on the matter
 the new standard does not define standing requirements as narrowly as some circuits did, but by adding the proximate causation test, it may ultimately make it more difficult for plaintiffs to show standing
 the Court's focus on statutory purposes and their implication for what a statute authorizes, rather than so-called "prudential" considerations, may limit standing and shift the debate over who can sue under a wide variety of federal laws

See also
Impression Prods., Inc. v. Lexmark Int'l, Inc.: similar ink cartridge case
Chamberlain v. Skylink, another copyright case posing similar DMCA questions
Sega v. Accolade, a copyright case involving interoperability issues with unlicensed Sega Genesis games.

References

External links
 
 
 
 
 
 
 

United States Supreme Court cases
United States copyright case law
United States Court of Appeals for the Sixth Circuit cases
2004 in United States case law
2012 in United States case law
2014 in United States case law
Digital Millennium Copyright Act case law
False advertising law
United States trademark case law
United States competition law
Lexmark
Computer printing
United States Supreme Court cases of the Roberts Court